The Inter-state bus terminal (ISBT) is a hi-tech bus stand currently being built by The Bhubaneswar Development Authority (BDA) over 15.5 acres of land near Baramunda at a cost of Rs 180 crore. It was expected to be completed by June this year. The bus depot at Khandagiri is also part of the project, having a capacity of 300 parking spaces.

There is also a parallel road to the Jayadev Vihar-Patia road being constructed by the Public Works Department (PWD) which connects CRPF Square to the Institute of Mathematics in phases. The total road length of the project is about 13.6 km. About 8.43 kilometer of six-lane road has been completed and 5.17 kilometer is under construction.

The project was announced after the Government Of Odisha decided to upgrade the bus stand into a state-of-the art ISBT as part of its transformation agenda under the 5-T model of governance.

References 

Transport in Odisha
Buildings and structures in Odisha
Bus stations in India